Na Pu Pom is a tambon (subdistrict) of Pang Mapha District, in Mae Hong Son Province, Thailand. In 2020 it had a total population of 4,806 people.

History
The subdistrict was created effective August 10, 1989 by splitting off 7 administrative villages from Pang Mapha.

Administration

Central administration
The tambon is subdivided into 12 administrative villages (muban).

Local administration
The whole area of the subdistrict is covered by the subdistrict administrative organization (SAO) Na Pu Pom (องค์การบริหารส่วนตำบลนาปู่ป้อม).

References

External links
Thaitambon.com on Na Pu Pom

Tambon of Mae Hong Son province
Populated places in Mae Hong Son province